Tito Speri was one of four s built for the  (Royal Italian Navy) during the 1920s.

Design and description
The Mameli class was one of the 's first classes of submarines to be built after the First World War. They displaced  surfaced and  submerged. Their crew numbered 49 officers and enlisted men.

For surface running, the boats were powered by two  diesel engines, each driving one propeller shaft. When submerged each propeller was driven by a  electric motor. They could reach  on the surface and  underwater.

The boats were armed with six  torpedo tubes, four in the bow and two in the stern for which they carried a total of 10 torpedoes. They were also armed with a single  deck gun forward of the conning tower for combat on the surface. Their anti-aircraft armament consisted of two single  machine guns.

Construction and career
Tito Speri was laid down by Cantieri navali Tosi di Taranto at their Taranto shipyard in 1925, launched on 25 May 1928 and completed in 1929.

Notes

References

External links
 Tito Speri Marina Militare website

Mameli-class submarines
World War II submarines of Italy
1928 ships
Ships built by Cantieri navali Tosi di Taranto
Ships built in Taranto